Amy Mbacké Thiam (born November 10, 1976) is a Senegalese athlete competing in the 400 metres.

Biography
She has won medals in two World Championships, but at the 2004 Olympics she was knocked out in the heats. She is best known for winning the gold medal at the 2001 World Championships in Athletics held in Edmonton, Alberta, Canada.  With her 49.86 in that victory, she still holds the Senegal national record.

Competition record

See also
Senegal at the 2004 Summer Olympics

References

External links

1976 births
Living people
Senegalese female sprinters
Athletes (track and field) at the 2000 Summer Olympics
Athletes (track and field) at the 2004 Summer Olympics
Athletes (track and field) at the 2012 Summer Olympics
Olympic athletes of Senegal
World Athletics Championships medalists
World Athletics Championships athletes for Senegal
African Games silver medalists for Senegal
African Games medalists in athletics (track and field)
Goodwill Games medalists in athletics
Athletes (track and field) at the 1999 All-Africa Games
Athletes (track and field) at the 2011 All-Africa Games
World Athletics Championships winners
Competitors at the 2001 Goodwill Games
20th-century Senegalese women
21st-century Senegalese women